The 2009 NBA Finals was the championship series of the National Basketball Association's (NBA) 2008–09 season and the conclusion of the season's playoffs, played from June 4 and June 14, 2009. A best-of-seven playoff series, it was contested between the Western Conference champion Los Angeles Lakers, and the Eastern Conference champion Orlando Magic. The Lakers were heavily favored to win the championship over the Magic.

The Lakers defeated the Magic, four games to one, to win the franchise's 15th NBA championship. Kobe Bryant was named the Finals MVP. The Orlando Magic's Game 3 victory was the first win in an NBA Finals game in franchise history; they were previously swept in 1995 by the Houston Rockets.

Series summary

Background
The two team captains (the Lakers' Kobe Bryant and the Magic's Dwight Howard) were teammates and starters on the United States men's national team the previous summer, winning a gold medal at the 2008 Summer Olympics in Beijing. Each player defeated another fellow Olympic starter in his respective conference final series: Bryant defeated Carmelo Anthony's Denver Nuggets and Howard advanced past LeBron James' Cleveland Cavaliers.

2009 NBA Playoffs

Los Angeles Lakers

The Lakers were the favorite to emerge from the Western Conference, but their road to the Finals was a tough one. They played three physical series against the Utah Jazz, Houston Rockets, and Denver Nuggets, winning in 5, 7, and 6 games, respectively. Going into the Finals, the Lakers finished off the Nuggets in the Western Conference Finals with two good performances in Games 5 and 6, making analysts pick them as the favorites in the Finals. It was their sixth Finals appearance of the decade and a record-extending 30th Finals appearance overall, the most for any NBA team.

Orlando Magic

The Magic were overlooked by many to even reach the Eastern Conference Finals, as they played in the shadows of the #1-seeded Cleveland Cavaliers, led by regular-season MVP LeBron James, and defending champion #2-seed Boston Celtics. However, after dispatching the Philadelphia 76ers in six games, the Magic stunned the Celtics by winning Game 7 in Boston. The Celtics were previously 32–0 when leading a series 3–2, and 17–3 previously in Game 7s at home. Orlando assistant coach Patrick Ewing had publicly "guaranteed" that Orlando would win Game 7.

In the next round, Orlando was given little chance by many to defeat the top-seeded Cleveland Cavaliers, but a combination of three-point shooting and the inside presence of Dwight Howard created a matchup nightmare for Cleveland on defense, and Orlando ultimately won in six games. In Game 6, Howard's stellar performance with 40 points and 14 rebounds helped the franchise earn its second Finals appearance (they were swept by the Houston Rockets in the  Finals during Shaquille O'Neal and Penny Hardaway era).

Series preview
Although the Magic won both regular-season matchups with the Lakers, Los Angeles was able to take four out of five games in this series. Both regular-season games and three of the NBA Finals games were close contests, decided by six points or fewer or in overtime. The Lakers won Game 2 on June 7 101–96 in overtime. Then they won Game 4 on June 11 in overtime as well.

Tyronn Lue, a backup point guard with Orlando, appeared with the Lakers during their initial championship run in the early 2000s and faced his former team in the finals. Lue and another backup point guard, Anthony Johnson were the only players on Orlando's roster with NBA Finals experience. However, neither saw playing time during the series, as Lue was inactive with an injury and Johnson lost his minutes to teammate Jameer Nelson, who returned from a shoulder injury in time for the Finals, where he led the Magic to sweep the Lakers in regular season. Trevor Ariza, the Lakers starting small forward, faced the team that traded him to the Lakers in 2007.

Regular-season series
The Orlando Magic won both games in the regular-season series:

Game summaries
All times are in Eastern Daylight Time (UTC−4).  If the venue is located in a different time zone, the local time is also given.

Game 1

After an evenly battled first quarter, the Magic took the lead thanks to field goals and assists from point guard Jameer Nelson, who was playing his first game since injuring his shoulder during the regular season in February. Down 33–28 with 8:38 left in the 2nd quarter, the Lakers went on a 10–0 run and never looked back. The Lakers ended the 3rd quarter on a 25–10 run, led by the fierce play from Kobe Bryant, who finished with 40 points, 8 rebounds, and 8 assists, joining the likes of Shaquille O'Neal, Michael Jordan, and Jerry West to put up those numbers in a single NBA Finals game. The 25-point margin of victory was the 6th-largest in NBA Finals Game 1 history.

Due to stellar defense by the Lakers, Dwight Howard was a dismal 1–6 from the field, his fewest made field goals in his playoff career, and finished with 12 points, 10 of which came from free throws. The Magic shot only 29.9% (23–77) from the field, the second lowest percentage in the NBA Finals.

Game 2

Both teams got off to a slow start and were tied at 15 after the first quarter, setting a record-low for combined score (30) in the first quarter of an NBA Finals game. The Lakers picked up the pace in the 2nd quarter, but Rashard Lewis kept the Magic in the game, scoring 18 of the team's 20 points in the quarter, including the final 16, on his way to a playoff career-high and Finals franchise-high 34 points for the game. The Magic outscored the Lakers in the 3rd quarter to take a 2-point lead in the 4th.

With the game tied at 84, Rashard Lewis hit a jumper with 1:32 remaining to give the Magic a 2-point lead. Kobe Bryant responded with a jumper of his own to tie the game. With 47 seconds left, Hedo Türkoğlu hit a jumper that was originally called a three-pointer. However, replay showed that his foot was on the line, giving the Magic a two-point lead. With 33 seconds remaining, Dwight Howard was able to deflect, but not steal, a Derek Fisher pass, and Pau Gasol was able to again tie the game at 88 with a layup.

On the ensuing Magic possession, the Lakers played great defense and forced Courtney Lee to miss an awkward layup shot with 10.5 seconds left. With a chance to take a 2–0 series lead, Kobe Bryant was blocked on a jumper by Türkoğlu, who gained control of the ball and called time-out with 0.6 seconds left. After another timeout, Türkoğlu threw a half-court lob to Courtney Lee, who had come free after a screen on his defender. However, Lee was traveling too fast and launched his layup from almost behind the backboard, causing it to miss.

With the Lakers up 1 in overtime with 1:55 left, Derek Fisher stole a JJ Redick pass and was fouled on the ensuing fast break, making both free throws. After the Magic were unable to convert, Kobe Bryant made a pivotal assist to Pau Gasol for a layup-and-one, giving the Lakers a 6-point lead and the eventual victory.

Game 3

The Magic came out in Game 3 with fire. The Magic shot a field goal percentage of 63% for the game, a Finals record. This also included a 75% first quarter, also a Finals record. However, despite the incredible shooting percentage, the Lakers managed to stay close for much of the game. The game was only sealed for the Magic on a Mickaël Piétrus steal from Kobe Bryant in the waning minute of the 4th quarter.

This win marked the first Finals win in Magic franchise history, losing their first 6 Finals games (being swept in their first appearance and losing Games 1 and 2)

Game 4

Coming off their franchise's first NBA Finals game victory, the Magic quickly took the lead in the first quarter. However, Kobe Bryant kept the Lakers in the game, scoring 13 of the team's 20 first-quarter points. Dwight Howard played a great first quarter, with 11 rebounds and 4 blocks in the opening frame. In addition, he drew many fouls, putting Andrew Bynum, Pau Gasol, and Lamar Odom in foul trouble and forcing Lakers coach Phil Jackson to use Josh Powell and D. J. Mbenga early in the game. The Magic were able to increase the lead to 12 at halftime.

The Lakers came out of the locker room aggressive and outscored the Magic 30–14 in the 3rd quarter, led by Trevor Ariza, who scored 13 points in the quarter, including two three-pointers. Down by six in the opening minutes of the 4th quarter, the Magic took a 76–75 lead halfway through the quarter, but were unable to increase the lead due to poor free-throw shooting, specifically from Hedo Türkoğlu and Dwight Howard.

With 3 minutes left in the 4th quarter and the game tied at 79, Howard converted a three-point play to give the Magic an 82–79 lead. On the next Laker possession, the Magic played good defense, but Trevor Ariza was able to hit a 3-pointer as the shot clock expired to tie the game at 82. After Hedo Türkoğlu hit a stepback 3-point shot, Howard blocked Gasol's jumper, giving him a single-game NBA Finals record with 9 blocked shots. On the bench to witness it was a previous record holder, his assistant coach Patrick Ewing, who had 8 in Game 5 of the 1994 NBA Finals while with the New York Knicks. Türkoğlu made another jumper with 1:34 remaining to give the Magic a five-point lead.

Down 87–82 with 31 seconds left, Kobe Bryant spun through the lane and passed to Gasol for a dunk to cut the lead to three. On the next Magic possession, Howard was fouled by Bryant with 11 seconds remaining. Needing just one free-throw to make the game a 2-possession affair, Howard missed both shots.

Out of the timeout, the Lakers elected to take the ball out at three-quarters court instead of half-court in order to space out the floor. The Magic double-teamed Bryant in the backcourt, allowing him to pass the ball up to Ariza, who in turned passed it to Derek Fisher on the right wing. Having missed his first five three-point shots of the game, Fisher spotted up and hit a pivotal three-pointer over Jameer Nelson to tie the game at 87 with 4.6 seconds left. On the final possession of regulation, Mickaël Piétrus missed a 20-footer.

The overtime session began with a three-pointer by Rashard Lewis and two contested jumpers by Kobe Bryant to give the Lakers a 91–90 lead. With 1:27 left in overtime, Howard split a pair of free throws to tie the game at 91. On the next possession, the Lakers would miss a layup and a jumper, but regained possession on an offensive rebound by Ariza and a loose-ball foul on Jameer Nelson. With 31 seconds left, Kobe Bryant passed out of a double-team with the controversy of no called after Jameer Nelson got hit by Kobe Elbow as Fisher hit a three-pointer to give the Lakers a 94–91 lead.

Out of a timeout, Türkoğlu rushed a three-point shot and missed. Rashard Lewis backtapped the rebound to center court, but the ball went to Pau Gasol, who ran in unimpeded for a dunk, giving the Lakers the lead for good. In the next possession, the Magic missed another shot, bouncing the ball to Fisher, who passed it to Ariza, then to Gasol for a dunk, but Pietrus slammed both arms on his back, resulting in Gasol getting a technical foul and Pietrus a flagrant-1 foul.

Upon the game's finish, Oasis's "Don't Look Back in Anger" was played throughout Amway Arena.

Game 5

The Magic, facing the prospect of the Lakers winning a championship on their home floor, came out with a good start, leading by as much as 9 in the first quarter. In the opening frame, all 5 starters scored and assisted on at least one field goal, but the Lakers pulled within two at the quarter break. Down 40–36 with 7:11 in the 2nd quarter, the Lakers went on a 16–0 run, fueled by two 3-pointers and solid defensive play from Trevor Ariza. The Lakers led by as much as 12 in the 2nd quarter and the score was 56–46 at halftime.

Coming out of the half, Orlando cut the lead to 5 with 7:45 remaining in the 3rd on a three-pointer by Rafer Alston. Lamar Odom answered with back-to-back three-pointers to restore the Laker lead to double digits. Leading by as much as 18 in the half, Los Angeles led by 15 going into the 4th quarter. In the final quarter, Orlando attempted a run but managed to cut the lead down to only 12; at the buzzer, the Lakers celebrated their 15th title.

Following the game, NBA commissioner David Stern presented the Lakers with the Larry O'Brien Championship Trophy and presented Kobe Bryant with the Bill Russell NBA Finals MVP Trophy during a presentation on center court at Amway Arena. Bryant averaged 32.4 points, 5.6 rebounds, and 7.4 assists per game during the series.

Statistics

The series was the third straight championship the Lakers clinched on the road (after 2001 and 2002); the last time the Lakers clinched the championship at home was in 2000. With their team's win, Pau Gasol became the first Spaniard and D. J. Mbenga the first Belgian Congolese player to win an NBA championship. Bill and Luke Walton became the third father-son pair to each win a championship as a player; the other father-son combinations are Matt Guokas, Sr. (1947) with Matt Jr. (1967) and Rick Barry (1975) with son Brent (2005 and 2007). Kobe Bryant averaged 32.4 points and 7.4 assists in this series, which was the best combination of those categories since Jerry West averaged 37.9 points and 7.4 assists (1969).

For the Magic, Game 3 marked their first Finals game victory in franchise history after losing their first six Finals games, including being swept in their first Finals appearance in 1995. In Game 3, the Magic set the Finals record for the best field goal percentage with 63 percent, and the Finals record for best field goal percentage in the first half with 75 percent.

This was the first NBA Finals series since 1984 to have two games go into overtime (Games 2 and 4); both were won by the Lakers. Dwight Howard set an NBA Finals single-game record with 9 blocked shots in Game 4. The previous record holders, all of whom had blocked eight shots in a Finals game, were: Bill Walton of the Portland Trail Blazers in Game 6 of the 1977 NBA Finals; Hakeem Olajuwon of the Houston Rockets in Game 5 of the 1986 NBA Finals; Howard's assistant coach Patrick Ewing of the New York Knicks in Game 5 of the 1994 NBA Finals; Shaquille O'Neal of the Los Angeles Lakers in Game 2 of the 2001 NBA Finals; and Tim Duncan of the San Antonio Spurs in Game 6 of the 2003 NBA Finals.

This was the seventh time in NBA Finals history that a team that lost the championship the previous season has won the Finals the very next year. It is the second time in Lakers history, after the 1984 and 1985 teams.

This was also the first odd season since 2001 that the San Antonio Spurs did not win the NBA Finals; they won in 2003, 2005, and 2007.

This was the last Finals in which a trophy silhouette was painted in mid-court. The tradition began in 2005 and ended for the 2010 series. This was also the last NBA Finals to be played at Amway Arena; the Magic moved to the Amway Center for the 2010–11 season.

2009 NBA Finals rosters

Los Angeles Lakers

Orlando Magic

Player statistics

Los Angeles Lakers

|-
| align="left" |  || 5 || 5 || 37.6 || .357 || .417 || .500 || 6.0 || 1.6 || 1.8 || 0.2 || 11.0
|-
| align="left" |  || 3 || 0 || 5.2 || .000 || .000 || .000 || 0.3 || 0.0 || 0.0 || 0.0 || 0.0
|-! style="background:#FDE910;"
| align="left" |  || 5 || 5 || 43.8 || .430 || .360 || .841 || 5.6 || 7.4 || 1.4 || 1.4 || 32.4
|-
| align="left" |  || 5 || 5 || 18.9 || .364 || .000 || .667 || 4.2 || 0.6 || 0.4 || 0.6 || 6.0
|-
| align="left" |  || 5 || 0 || 11.5 || .368 || .125 || 1.000 || 1.2 || 0.4 || 0.4 || 0.0 || 3.4
|-
| align="left" |  || 5 || 5 || 35.9 || .500 || .438 || 1.000 || 3.0 || 1.8 || 1.2 || 0.0 || 11.0
|-
| align="left" |  || 5 || 5 || 42.5 || .600 || .000 || .778 || 9.2 || 2.2 || 0.8 || 1.8 || 18.6
|-
| align="left" |  || 3 || 0 || 2.0 || .000 || .000 || .000 || 0.3 || 0.0 || 0.0 || 0.3 || 0.0
|-
| align="left" |  || 5 || 0 || 33.8 || .542 || .500 || .688 || 7.8 || 0.8 || 1.0 || 1.0 || 13.4
|-
| align="left" |  || 2 || 0 || 5.5 || .500 || 1.000 || .000 || 2.0 || 0.5 || 0.0 || 0.0 || 2.5
|-
| align="left" |  || 5 || 0 || 4.4 || .000 || .000 || .000 || 0.4 || 0.4 || 0.0 || 0.0 || 0.0
|-
| align="left" |  || 5 || 0 || 15.2 || .800 || .000 || .500 || 2.0 || 1.0 || 0.2 || 0.0 || 3.8

Orlando Magic

|-
| align="left" |  || 5 || 5 || 29.5 || .368 || .158 || .800 || 2.2 || 3.0 || 0.8 || 0.0 || 10.6
|-
| align="left" |  || 5 || 0 || 7.0 || .455 || .000 || .000 || 0.8 || 0.4 || 0.0 || 0.4 || 2.0
|-
| align="left" |  || 5 || 0 || 10.7 || .467 || .000 || .500 || 2.6 || 0.0 || 0.4 || 1.0 || 3.2
|-
| align="left" |  || 5 || 5 || 42.6 || .488 || .000 || .603 || 15.2 || 2.2 || 1.6 || 4.0 || 15.4
|-
| align="left" |  || 5 || 5 || 17.6 || .375 || .182 || .750 || 1.4 || 0.2 || 0.6 || 0.0 || 5.8
|-
| align="left" |  || 5 || 5 || 42.5 || .405 || .400 || .846 || 7.6 || 4.0 || 0.8 || 0.0 || 17.4
|-
| align="left" |  || 5 || 0 || 18.0 || .348 || .167 || .500 || 1.4 || 2.8 || 0.2 || 0.0 || 3.8
|-
| align="left" |  || 5 || 0 || 28.0 || .475 || .333 || .786 || 2.0 || 0.4 || 0.6 || 0.2 || 10.6
|-
| align="left" |  || 4 || 0 || 16.3 || .400 || .455 || 1.000 || 0.5 || 2.0 || 0.3 || 0.0 || 5.5
|-
| align="left" |  || 5 || 5 || 41.1 || .492 || .438 || .742 || 4.6 || 3.8 || 0.8 || 0.4 || 18.0

International broadcasts
Aside from ABC (U.S.) and TSN (Canada), other broadcasters across the world covered the Finals:

 : Canal 7
 : ESPN and ONE HD
 : Be 1 and Prime Sport 1
 : Great Belize Television and Tropical Vision Limited (all games except games 2 and 5 joined in progress; Sunday games covered in full)
 : OBN
 : ESPN Latin America
 : ESPN Latin America
 : CCTV-5, several provincial broadcasters
 : Lumiere TV
 : DK4 Sport
 : Antena Latina
 : SKY México
 : Urheilukanava
 : Canal+, Orange Sport
 : Sport+
 : ESPN, Cable TV Hong Kong Sports Channel, Star Sports, TVB HD
 : Sport1, Sport2
 : Stöð 2 Sport
 : ESPN
 : ESPN, JakTV
 : Sky sport
 : Sport 5
 : J Sports Plus, NHK BS-1, SkyPerfecTV
 : SBS Sports, Star Sports
 : LTV7
 : ESPN Dos
  North Africa: aljazeera sport +3
 : Sport1
  Oman: NBA TV
 : ESPN Latin America, CMD
 : C/S 9, Basketball TV
 : Canal+Sport1
 : Sport TV 1
 : NBA TV
 : Canal +, Cuatro
 : TV4 AB
 : Videoland
 : ESPN
 : ESPN
 : NTV
 : Five / Setanta Sports 2
 : Sport Plus

Impact and aftermath

Lakers
The series win brought the Lakers' franchise championship total to 15, trailing only to the Boston Celtics. The championship was the fourth of the 2000s decade for the Lakers, most among all teams in the four major professional sports leagues in North America.

The victory was noted by many as a personal success for Finals MVP Kobe Bryant, winning his first championship and succeeding in the playoffs without the presence of former Lakers center Shaquille O'Neal where some people had previously speculated that Bryant could not "win one without Shaq". Head coach Phil Jackson captured his 10th NBA championship as a coach, surpassing Red Auerbach for most championships all-time by an NBA coach. Jackson also passed Auerbach and NHL coach Scotty Bowman for most championships all-time by a head coach in a major American sports league. Having achieved three Game 1 victories throughout the postseason (first round vs. Utah, conference finals vs. Denver, and NBA Finals vs. Orlando), Phil Jackson-coached teams were now 44–0 in series where they win the first game, later improved to 48–0 by the time Jackson retired after the 2011 NBA Playoffs.

The Lakers' only offseason change was the acquisition of Ron Artest from the Houston Rockets, in an essential trade where they let Trevor Ariza sign with the Rockets. Again the Lakers won the top seed in the West, though winning just eight games less than the year before. They eliminated the Oklahoma City Thunder in six, the Utah Jazz in four, and the Phoenix Suns in six to return to the NBA Finals and renew their heated rivalry with the Celtics. In the Finals the Lakers won a hard-fought seven game series against the Celtics to retain the NBA title, becoming the first team to repeat as champions since the 2002 Lakers.

Magic
The Magic again won 59 games and the division title in the 2009–10 season, in which they let go of Hedo Türkoğlu to the Toronto Raptors and acquired Vince Carter from the New Jersey Nets. Dwight Howard won Defensive Player of the Year for the second straight year. In the playoffs the Magic swept the Charlotte Bobcats and the Atlanta Hawks, becoming the first team in NBA history to win their first eight playoff games by 20 or more points. However, the Magic would lose to the Boston Celtics in six games of the Eastern Conference Finals, marking the final games held at Amway Arena. The Magic moved to the Amway Center the next season, then proceeded to lose in the first round for two straight years to the Hawks and the Indiana Pacers, respectively. After the 2011–12 season Stan Van Gundy was fired, and in a blockbuster offseason trade, Howard was traded to the Lakers, which he spent one season with the Lakers and later move to Houston Rockets. However, the team failed to reach NBA Finals due to the rise of the Golden State Warriors. Thus, Howard return to the Eastern Conference teams after signing with Atlanta Hawks.

References

External links

2009 NBA Finals at ESPN
2009 NBA Finals at Basketball Reference

National Basketball Association Finals
National Basketball Association controversies
Finals
NBA
NBA
Basketball competitions in Los Angeles
Basketball competitions in Orlando, Florida
2009 in sports in Florida
2009 in sports in California
2009 in Los Angeles
2000s in Orlando, Florida